Indian Jim's Cave is a historic archaeological site located near Halifax, Halifax County, Virginia.  "Indian Jim" is generally acknowledged as the last full-time tenant of the cave and it is believed that he is buried nearby.

It was listed on the National Register of Historic Places in 1982.

References

Archaeological sites on the National Register of Historic Places in Virginia
Caves of Virginia
National Register of Historic Places in Halifax County, Virginia